The Valparaiso Community Schools (VCS) is the school system that serves Center Township, Porter County, Indiana, United States.  Center Township is predominantly the city of Valparaiso.

Schools
 Valparaiso High School
 Benjamin Franklin Middle School
 Thomas Jefferson Middle School
 Central Elementary School
 Cooks Corner Elementary School
 Flint Lake Elementary School
 Hayes Leonard Elementary School
 Memorial Elementary School
 Parkview Elementary School
 Northview Elementary School
 Thomas Jefferson Elementary School
 Porter County Career Center

References

External links 
 Official site

Education in Porter County, Indiana
School districts in Indiana
1874 establishments in Indiana
School districts established in 1874